Olivia Cheng Man Nga (born 14 February 1960), is a Hong Kong based former actress.

Background
She won the 1979 Miss Hong Kong Pageant and was also elected "Miss Photogenic."  She represented Hong Kong in Miss Universe 1979 in Perth, Western Australia, where she went unplaced but ranked a very respectable 21st place in the preliminary swimsuit competition.  Olivia created a controversy when she joined ATV (the arch-rival of TVB, the organiser of the Miss Hong Kong pageant) immediately after crowning her successor in 1980.  This incident embarrassed TVB so much that in 1981, TVB decided to sign 1.5-year contracts with all Miss Hong Kong winners so that they had to stay with TVB for at least 6 months after their reign was over.

Subsequently Olivia she was the cover model of the first issue of Playboy magazine's Hong Kong edition, appearing in a topless pictorial inside. More pictures from the same photo session, filmed by Kevin Orpin in Boracay, later appeared as a large format book.

She was married to business executive Jeffrey Yu in 1991.

A high jump champion in secondary school, Olivia was known for her sporty and active image. She is a golf pro and teaches golf now.

Filmography

References

External links

Pictures on Miss Hong Kong website

1960 births
Living people
Hong Kong film actresses
Hong Kong television actresses
Miss Hong Kong winners
20th-century Hong Kong actresses